Sarsuna College, established in 1999, is an undergraduate college in Kolkata, West Bengal, India, affiliated with the University of Calcutta. Sarsuna College is a relatively newer institution of higher learning under the University of Calcutta. It started to function as an evening College in the building of Sarsuna High School.

Inauguration of the College Building

22 February 2003
Inaugurated by Chief Minister of West Bengal, Sri Jyoti Basu

Logo

The logo of the college symbolises a pen on an open book partially encircled by the first line of one of Rabindranath Tagore’s well known song, Aguner Parashmani Chhoyaon Praane (আগুনের পরশমণি ছোঁয়াও প্রাণে). This logo is a graphic representation of the college motto, "Let the divine fire of knowledge enlighten, purify and discipline human soul."

See also 
List of colleges affiliated to the University of Calcutta
Education in India
Education in West Bengal

References

External links
Acharya Girish Chandra Bose College

Educational institutions established in 1999
University of Calcutta affiliates
Universities and colleges in Kolkata
1999 establishments in West Bengal